Zuidvelde is a village in the Netherlands and it is part of the Noordenveld municipality in Drenthe.

History 
Zuidvelde is an esdorp which developed in the middle ages on higher grounds. The large communal pasture of the village is grassed by sheep. It was first mentioned in 1325 as "Stephanus de Zutvelde" and means "the southern field of Stephan". South refers to Norg. The farm on Asserstraat 78 dates from around 1570. In 1840, it was home to 90 people.

References 

Populated places in Drenthe
Noordenveld